The 2012 BWF World Junior Championships were held in Chiba, Japan from October 25 to November 3, 2012.

Medalists

Medal table

External links
World Juniors Team Championships 2012 at Tournamentsoftware.com
World Junior Championships 2012 at Tournamentsoftware.com

 
BWF World Junior Championships
World Junior Championships
2012 Bwf World Junior Championships
Bwf World Junior Championships
Sport in Chiba (city)
2012 in Japanese sport
2012 in youth sport